Lake Sülüklü, for "Lake of the Leeches", is a freshwater lake located at Banaz district in Uşak Province, Turkey.

References

Suluklu (Usak)
Landforms of Uşak Province
Banaz District